Drăgănești is a commune in Sîngerei District, Moldova. It is composed of three villages: Chirileni, Drăgănești and Sacarovca.

Notable people
 Alexandru Groapă
 Serhiy Tihipko

References

Communes of Sîngerei District